Ganeshguri is locality in Guwahati, Assam, is named after lord Ganesh, also known as Heramba. There was a Heramba kingdom. There is also a Ganesh Temple located in its southern part. Situated in capital complex of Guwahati city, it is a major commercial area within the city. Assam State Secretariat Buildings are located here. Ganeshguri is one of the major commercial areas of Guwahati city. Market consists mainly of various segments such as garments, crockeries, home decor, music stores, medical stores, sweet stores, groceries, automobile showroom etc. Various restaurants have been opened up in the area serving various cuisines. Fast food chains like Pizza Hut, KFC have opened up. Ethnic restaurants like Janming and Gam's Delicacy have made the area a popular place for outings. Several important establishments such as Guwahati Tea Auction Centre, Ambarish Hotel etc. are located here.

See also
 Beltola
 Bhetapara
 Chandmari
 Maligaon
 Paltan Bazaar
 History of Beltola

References

Bibliography

Neighbourhoods in Guwahati